Giannis Chelis (born 26 May 1985) was a Greek footballer, who last played for Ethnikos Piraeus F.C. in the Football League 2 as a centre back.

References
ετοιμος να προσφέρω
ανανέωσε  ο χέλης στον εθνικό πειραια

1985 births
Living people
Footballers from Athens
Greek footballers
Olympiacos F.C. players
Ethnikos Piraeus F.C. players
Association football central defenders